Dennis Leston, born Dennis Fingleston (2 February 1917 – 7 October 1981) was an English entomologist best known for his contributions to the study of Heteroptera.

Following a start in life as a student of medicine Leston served with the Royal Army Medical Corps during World War II where he developed his fascination with insects.

Leston was a member of the South London Entomological Society and was elected a Fellow of the Royal Entomological Society in 1949. After gaining a D.I.C. by research from Imperial College in the early 1960s Leston studied and worked at a number of universities, including the University of Ghana.

Dennis Leston was the older brother of racing driver Les Leston.

In 1949 he married Audrey; the couple had three daughters. He died while working in Florida, from lung cancer.

Works (selection)
 Leston, Pendergrast & Southwood. 1954. Classification of the Terrestrial Heteroptera (Geocorisae). Nature. 174: 91-92. https://doi.org/10.1038/174091b0
 Southwood & Leston. 1959. Land and water bugs of the British Isles. Warne, London.
 Leston. 1970. Entomology of the cocoa farm. Annual Review of Entomology, 15, 273-294. https://doi.org/10.1146/annurev.en.15.010170.001421
 Leston. 1972. The natural history of some West African ants. Entomologist's Monthly Magazine, 108, 110-122.
 Leston. 1973. The Ant Mosaic - Tropical Tree Crops and the Limiting of Pests and Diseases. PANS Pest Articles & News Summaries. 19 (3): 311-341 https://doi.org/10.1080/09670877309412778
 Leston. 1973-1974. Ants and tropical tree crops. (Abstract in) Proceedings of the Royal Entomological Society of London, 38, 21.

References

1917 births
1981 deaths
English entomologists
Fellows of the Royal Entomological Society
Hemipterists
20th-century British zoologists
British expatriates in Ghana
British expatriates in the United States